Graham Peter Burnett (born 7 October 1965 in Tauranga) is a former New Zealand cricketer who played for the Wellington and the Northern Districts. Burnett played from the 1987–88 season until the 1994–95 season.

In the 1991–92 he and Ross Verry added 346 against Northern Districts for the third wicket at Seddon Park, Hamilton. , this remains a record for all partnerships by Wellington.

References

1965 births
Living people
New Zealand cricketers
Northern Districts cricketers
Wellington cricketers
Sportspeople from Tauranga